Helmut Vaag (born Arthur-Helmuth Vaag; 29 May 1911 Juuru Parish – 8 July 1978 Tallinn) was an Estonian actor and director.

1927-1931 he studied at Tallinna Töölisteater's studying studio. 1933–1940 he was an actor at Tallinn Töölisteater, 1940–1951 and 1961–1975 at Estonian Drama Theatre, 1952–1953 at Estonian Puppet Theatre. 1952–1961 he was an estrade actor at Estonian SSR State Philharmonic (nowadays Eesti Kontsert). Besides theatre roles he played also in several films.

Awards
 1966: Meritorious Artist of the Estonian SSR

Filmography
 Põrgupõhja uus Vanapagan as Auctioneer (1964) 
 Mäeküla piimamees (1965)
 Keskpäevane praam as Card player (1967) 
 Viimne reliikvia as Innkeeper (1969) 
 Mehed ei nuta (1969)
 The Ambassador of the Soviet Union as Daddy Gunar, fisherman (1970)
 Tuuline rand (1971)
 Noor pensionär as Leopold (1972) 
 Maaletulek as Ella's husband (1973)

References

1911 births
1978 deaths
Estonian male stage actors
Estonian male film actors
Estonian male musical theatre actors
Estonian male radio actors
Estonian male television actors
20th-century Estonian male actors
Estonian theatre directors
People from Rapla Parish
20th-century Estonian male singers